Albert Monmouth Jones (July 20, 1890 – May 12, 1967) was an American major general and commanded the 51st Philippine Division during the Japanese invasion in World War II.

Born in Quincy, Massachusetts, Jones was commissioned as a second lieutenant of infantry in 1911. He served as a temporary major during World War I.

Jones was an honors graduate of the Command and General Staff School in 1924 and graduated from the Army War College in 1932. He was promoted to lieutenant colonel in August 1935 and colonel in November 1940.

Sent to the Philippines in 1940, Jones was initially given command of the 31st Infantry Regiment. He was subsequently assigned to organize and command the 51st Division. After the Japanese invasion, Jones was made commanding general of I Corps (Philippines). He received temporary promotions to brigadier general in December 1941 and major general in March 1942. Jones was awarded the Distinguished Service Cross by General Douglas MacArthur in February 1942. After surrendering to Japanese forces in April 1942, he spent over three years as a prisoner of war.

After the war, Jones served as chief of the Military Advisory Group in the Philippines. His wartime promotion to major general was made permanent in January 1948. He retired from active duty on July 31, 1952.

Jones died at Letterman General Hospital in San Francisco. He was interred at Golden Gate National Cemetery.

References

External links
The Pacific War Online Encyclopedia - Jones, Albert Monmouth (1890-1967)
Hall of Valor - Albert M. Jones
Generals of World War II

1890 births
1967 deaths
People from Quincy, Massachusetts
Military personnel from Massachusetts
United States Army personnel of World War I
United States Army Command and General Staff College alumni
United States Army War College alumni
United States Army generals of World War II
Recipients of the Silver Star
Recipients of the Distinguished Service Cross (United States)
American prisoners of war in World War II
World War II prisoners of war held by Japan
Bataan Death March prisoners
Recipients of the Distinguished Service Medal (US Army)
United States Army generals
Recipients of the Legion of Merit
United States Army personnel of the Korean War
Burials at Golden Gate National Cemetery